This is a list of notable alumni of the University of Maryland Francis King Carey School of Law (Maryland Carey Law), formerly named University of Maryland School of Law (UM Law) until 2011, and located in Baltimore, Maryland, U.S.

Governors
The following former Maryland governors are alumni of UM Law:
Austin Lane Crothers (1890), 46th Governor of Maryland, 1908–1912
Marvin Mandel (1942), 56th Governor of Maryland, 1969–1979
Theodore McKeldin (1925), 53rd Governor of Maryland, 1951–1959
Herbert O'Conor (1920), 51st Governor of Maryland, 1939–1947; U.S. Senate, 1947–1953
Martin O'Malley (1988), 61st Governor of Maryland, 2007–2015; 47th Mayor of Baltimore, 1999–2006, Candidate for Democratic nominee for President of the United States, 2016.
Albert Ritchie (1898), 49th Governor of Maryland, 1920–1935

U.S. Senators
The following current and former U.S. Senators are alumni of UM Law:
Daniel Brewster (1949), U.S. Senator from Maryland, 1963–1969; U.S. Congressman for Maryland's 2nd District, 1959–1963
William Cabell Bruce (1882), U.S. Senator from Maryland, 1923–1929
Ben Cardin (1967), U.S. Senator for Maryland, 2007–present; U.S. Congressman for United States House of Representatives, 1987–2006
Charles Mathias (1949), U.S. Senator from Maryland, 1969–1987
George L. P. Radcliffe (1903), U.S. Senator from Maryland, 1935–1947
Joseph Tydings (1953) U.S. Senator from Maryland, 1965–1971
Millard Tydings (1913) U.S. Senator from Maryland, 1927–1951

U.S. Congressmen
The following current and former U.S. Congressmen are alumni of UM Law:
William Purington Cole Jr. (1912), U.S. Congressman from Maryland's 2nd District, 1927–1929 and 1931–1942
Elijah Cummings (1976), U.S. Congressman for Maryland's 7th District, 1996–2020
John Charles Linthicum (1890), U.S. Congressman for Maryland's 4th District, 1911–1932
Hugh Meade (1932), U.S. Congressman for Maryland 2nd District, 1947–1949
Eric Swalwell (2006), U.S. Congressman for California's 15th Congressional District, 2013–present

State Senators
The following current and former State Senators, primarily from the Maryland Senate, are alumni of UM Law:
Walter M. Baker (1960), former member of the Maryland Senate, 1979–2003
F. Vernon Boozer (1964), former member of the Maryland Senate, 1981–1999
Harry A. Cole, first African American elected to the Maryland Senate, 1954–1958
Tom Davis, member of the South Carolina Senate, 2008–present
Bill Ferguson (2010), member of the Maryland Senate, 2010–Present 
Lisa A. Gladden (1991), majority whip of the Maryland State Senate
Allan H. Kittleman (1988), member of the Maryland Senate, 2004–2014; Howard County Executive, 2014–2018.
Mike Miller (1967), President of the Maryland Senate, 1987–present

State Delegates
The following current and former members of the Maryland House of Delegates are alumni of UM Law:
Andrew J. Burns Jr. (1960), former member of the Maryland House of Delegates 1966–1983
Michael W. Burns (1983), former member of the Maryland House of Delegates
Jon S. Cardin (2001), member of the Maryland House of Delegates
Michael U. Gisriel (1976), former member of the Maryland House of Delegates 1987–1991
Anthony McConkey (1990), member of Maryland House of Delegates, 2003–present
Emil B. Pielke (1971), former member of Maryland House of Delegates, 2002–2003
Mary Louise Preis (1983), former member of Maryland House of Delegates, 1991–1999
Kenneth D. Schisler (1998), former member of Maryland House of Delegates, and chair of Maryland Public Service Commission
John G. Trueschler (1991), former member of the Maryland House of Delegates, 2003–2007

Judges
Some notable alumni of UM Law have been appointed as judges, particularly in the Maryland Court of Appeals and Special Appeals. A few have been appointed to the U.S. District Court for the District of Maryland or other federal courts. The following current and former judges graduated from UM Law:
Sally D. Adkins (1975), judge, Maryland Court of Appeals (Maryland's highest court), 2008–present
Mary Ellen Barbera (1984), chief judge, Maryland Court of Appeals (Maryland's highest court), 2009–present
John D. Bates, judge for the U.S. District Court for the District of Columbia, 2001–present
Lynne A. Battaglia (1974), judge, Maryland Court of Appeals, 2001–2016
Richard D. Bennett (1973), judge, U.S. District Court for the District of Maryland, 2003–present
Andre M. Davis (1978), judge U.S. Court of Appeals for the Fourth Circuit 2009–2017; judge, U.S. District Court for the District of Maryland, 1995–2009; Baltimore City Solicitor, 2017–2020.
Paul A. Fioravanti, Jr. (1997), Vice Chancellor (judge), Delaware Court of Chancery (2020–present)
Joseph M. Getty (1996), judge, Maryland Court of Appeals, 2016–
Clayton Greene Jr. (1976), judge, Maryland Court of Appeals, 2004–present
John R. Hargrove Sr., Judge, U.S. District Court for the District of Maryland
Glenn T. Harrell Jr. (1970), judge, Maryland Court of Appeals, 1999–2015
Bernard S. Meyer (1938), associate judge, New York Court of Appeals
Joseph F. Murphy Jr. (1969), chief judge, Maryland Court of Special Appeals, 1996–2007; judge, Maryland Court of Appeals, 2008–2011
Robert C. Murphy (1951), Chief Judge, Maryland Court of Appeals, 1972–1996
Julie Rubin (1995), judge, U.S. District Court for the District of Maryland, 2022–present
George Levi Russell III, (1991), judge, U.S. District Court for the District of Maryland, 2012–present
Simon Sobeloff (1915), former chief judge, United States Court of Appeals for the Fourth Circuit; former Solicitor General of the United States
Julie Stevenson Solt, judge on the Circuit Court for Frederick County in Maryland
Alan M. Wilner (1962), judge, Maryland Court of Appeals, 1996–2007

Mayors
The following former Mayors of Baltimore are alumni of UM Law:
Thomas L.J. D'Alesandro III, former Mayor of Baltimore
Stephanie Rawlings-Blake (1995), former president of Baltimore City council; 49th Mayor of Baltimore

Attorneys General
The following former Attorneys General of Maryland and U.S. Attorneys General are alumni of UM Law:
Benjamin Civiletti (1961), senior partner and former Chair of Venable LLP; former Attorney General of the United States
Edgar Allan Poe (1893), Attorney General of Maryland

Others
Elijah Bond, inventor of the ouija board
Edward A. Christmas (1929), Thoroughbred racehorse trainer.
Donald P. Dunbar (2003), U.S. Air Force general; Adjutant General of Wisconsin
A.B. "Buzzy" Krongard (1975), former executive director of the 
Jamie McCourt (1978), owner of the Los Angeles Dodgers
Donald Gaines Murray, the first African-American to enter the University of Maryland School of Law since 1890 as a result of winning the landmark civil rights case Murray v. Pearson in 1935.
Peter Newsham (2000), Chief of the Metropolitan Police Department of the District of Columbia
Robert Houston Noble (1892), U.S. Army brigadier general
Robert M. Parker Jr. (1973), founder and editor of The Wine Advocate
Peter Rheinstein, former  official
William P. Richardson (1895), co-founder and first Dean of Brooklyn Law School
William C. Schmeisser (1907), National Lacrosse Hall of Fame inductee
Arnold M. Weiner (1957), principal in the Law Offices of Arnold M. Weiner; fellow of the American College of Trial Lawyers
Rose Zetzer, first woman admitted to the Maryland State Bar Association
 Anya Marino, first transgender woman of color to teach at Harvard Law School and civil rights and constitutional lawyer

References

External links
 

United States law-related lists
 
Lists of people by university or college in Maryland